Tajikistan competed at the 2020 Summer Paralympics in Tokyo, Japan, from 24 August to 5 September 2021.

Athletics 

Tajikistan's only athlete at the Games, Akmal Qodirov, competed in the final of the men's shot put in the F63 classification on 4 September 2021.

Men's field

See also

 Tajikistan at the Paralympics
 Tajikistan at the 2020 Summer Olympics

References

Nations at the 2020 Summer Paralympics
2020
2020 in Tajikistani sport